Saint-Pryvé-Saint-Mesmin is a commune in the Loiret department in north-central France.

Population

See also
 Communes of the Loiret department

References

External links
 Official Web site 

Saintpryvesaintmesmin